Inside Out: The Mixtape is the first official mixtape by Kat DeLuna.In September, during her mini promo tour in Belgium and then in France, DeLuna signed a new contract Universal Music Belgium. This new deal will assure the release of her album in Europe, United Kingdom and Australia. A mixtape Inside Out: The Mixtape was released for fans on September 10, 2010.

Track listing

Notes
 "New York City Gurls" samples California Gurls by Katy Perry.

2010 mixtape albums
Kat DeLuna albums